The Algeria national cycling team represents Algeria in International cycling competitions such as Olympic Games or World cycling Championships.

Medal count
Algeria has 13 participations in the Summer Olympic of 27 editions held from 1896 to 2016.

List of medalists at Mediterranean Games

See also
Algeria at the Olympics

References

External links
cycling at Summer Olympics

Cycling
Cycling in Algeria
National cycling teams